Remidicherla is a small village in Yerrupalem Mandal of Khammam District. It is the second-most populated village in Yerrupalem Mandal.

Transport 
It is well-connected with Vijayawada and Khammam. The nearest railway station to the village is Yerrupalem Railway Station. There is good local transport system connected to village from Yerrupalem Railway Station and Bus stop.

Demographics 
According to the 2011 Census, 11% of the village is made up of children aged 0–6.

Agriculture 
The main crops cultivated in this area are cotton, spices and maize.

Gallery

References 

Villages in Khammam district